A summary of 1822 in birding and ornithology.

Events
William John Burchell describes the Kori bustard and the blacksmith lapwing in Volume one of Travels in the Interior of Southern Africa
Carl Peter Thunberg describes the planalto tyrannulet in the Memoires of  The Saint Petersburg Academy of Sciences
Carl Hilsenberg describes the sooty albatross
Eduard Rüppell and surgeon Michael Hey are  the first European explorers to reach the Gulf of Aqaba.
Foundation of Musée d'Histoire Naturelle de Lille
Heinrich Boie erects new genera of birds in Lorenz Oken's Isis

Expeditions
1822-25 " La Coquille" (later named L'Astrolabe) circumnavigation under Louis Isidore Duperrey,(captain), Deblois (officer), Auguste Bérard (officer), Jules Dumont d'Urville (officer and botanist), René Primevère Lesson (surgeon and zoologist), Prosper Garnot, 1794–1838, (surgeon and zoologist), Victor Charles Lottin, 1795–1858, (hydrographer), Jacques Arago(artist)
1822-24  "Jane" & "Beaufoy" Weddell Sea and Antarctic.(British)

Ongoing events
William John Swainson Zoological Illustrations (commenced 1820) New bird species  described in this work in 1822 are the lettered aracari and the Temminck's courser
Louis Jean Pierre Vieillot Tableau encyclopédique et méthodique des trois regnes de la nature. New species described in 1822 in this work are  black-billed scythebill, splendid glossy-starling, ruby-crowned tanager and hepatic tanager

Births

Deaths
23 February - Johann Matthäus Bechstein (born 1757)
28 November - Francisco Antonio Zea (born 1766)

Birding and ornithology by year
1822 in science